The Charing Cross Complex - now styled as Elmbank Gardens (but sometimes popularly referred to as the Charing Cross Tower), is a multi-use commercial complex in the Charing Cross area of Glasgow, Scotland. Best known for its signature 14-storey tower which overlooks the M8 motorway and stands directly opposite the Mitchell Library, it was designed by Richard Seifert and constructed between 1969 and 1973. It is one of the tallest and most prominent high rise buildings on the western side of Glasgow city centre, beyond Blythswood Hill. The surface buildings of the subterranean railway station which serves Charing Cross are also an integral part of the complex.

Since 1995, the tower element has been used as a hotel, whilst the remainder of the complex is home to offices and a number of other leisure and entertainment businesses.

History

The 1960s saw great change in Glasgow, following on from the Bruce Report with initiatives well under way to depopulate the overcrowded centre, removing slum housing and the construction of a new system of high speed roads around the central area. The districts of Charing Cross and Anderston lay in the path of the Glasgow Inner Ring Road (now part of the M8) and consequently huge swathes of buildings were demolished to make way for its construction. The Richard Seifert Co-Partnership won the commission for much of the regeneration plan for the area, a grand scheme was planned which would stretch from the former Anderston Cross to the Charing Cross area. The original plans for the Elmbank complex would have made use of the infamous Charing Cross Podium which stretched across the motorway, but in the end only fragments of the Seifert scheme were built - likewise his nearby Anderston Centre was never fully realized either.

The original tenant of the building was the YARD (Yarrow-Admiralty Research Department) - part of the Clyde naval shipbuilder Yarrow Shipbuilders - and it was officially opened by Prince Philip, Duke of Edinburgh, in 1976.  YARD remained the tenant until 1992 when Yarrows' takeover by GEC-Marconi (ultimately British Aerospace), and a complex series of mergers and acquisitions which resulted in consolidation of its activities in the city. The building was vacated, and stood empty for over 2 years until a new use was found.

In the early 1990s, the Glasgow Development Agency had undertaken market research which showed that there would be a need for 650 budget hotel bedrooms in the city by late 1995. With this in mind, in 1994 the a lease on the building was taken by a company called Surveylink from its owner, Westmoreland Properties, to create a 270 bedroom hotel which was to be operated by the YMCA. The £4.5 million refurbishment of the building was undertaken by Taylor Woodrow (Scotland) Ltd to designs of Geoffrey Reid Associates and Structural Engineers Crouch Hogg Waterman, under the supervision of Surveylink who had their offices on the top floor of the building. The hotel opened in March 1995, creating 50 jobs. During the renovation, the building received a canopy on the roof, creating a covered "14th floor" to disguise the elevator penthouse.

It was later sold to the Tower Hotels Group in 1995 and operated as The Charing Cross Tower Hotel. The hotel was later operated by Premier Lodge, Premier Inn, and in 2022 was then taken over by Britannia Hotels.

A proposal to demolish the unused podium at the north west corner of the structure and replace it with a 19-storey residential tower known as The Venlaw Tower (earlier styled as Elmbank Tower) was proposed in 2004, but did not progress. 

The complex was externally refurbished between 2012 and 2013, the precast concrete panels being restored to their original brilliant white finish.

Construction

The development has a close conceptual similarity to Seifert’s famous Centre Point complex in London, being a series of low rise offices and retail units between two and five stories, anchored by a high rise office tower. The complex also incorporated an unused extension to the adjacent King's Theatre. These elements frame a sunken garden in the centre, providing a focus for pedestrian flows from both Bath Street and Elmbank Crescent. Two cast concrete murals by local artists Charles Anderson and Keith McCarter feature on the internal pathways of the complex.

A podium structure to the north west between the West and North blocks was originally intended to carry a public house, but it was never used. Eventually a prefabricated structure (which now contains a snack bar) was erected on it. The building was also constructed in tandem with a replacement railway station on the subterranean section of the North Clyde Line which runs to the south of the site. The precast concrete elements were derived from those used in Seifert’s other commission for the area - the Anderston Centre a few hundred meters to the south, and were also used in a slightly different form in the Sheraton Park Tower Hotel in London, which was built around the same period.

Although originally simply known as the "Charing Cross Complex", the Elmbank Gardens name originates from the street addresses used for the individual buildings of the complex, but now refers to the entire development.

In popular culture

 The tower features prominently on the back cover of local band Deacon Blue’s debut album Raintown, on Oscar Marzaroli's atmospheric photo of the Kingston Bridge northern approach blasting through the city centre, with both Elmbank Gardens and the Mitchell Library both fully illuminated on either side of the busy motorway.

References

Richard Seifert buildings
Skyscrapers in Glasgow
Brutalist architecture in Scotland
Buildings and structures completed in 1971
Hotels in Glasgow
1971 establishments in Scotland
Skyscraper hotels in the United Kingdom